The Baltimore oriole is a bird species.

Baltimore oriole(s) may also refer to:

Sports
In sports, Baltimore Orioles most commonly refers to a Major League Baseball team of the American League since 1954; previously the St. Louis Browns (1902–1953), and old Milwaukee Brewers (1894–1901).

Other teams named the Baltimore Orioles include:
 Baltimore Orioles (1882–1899), an 1882–1899 baseball team in the old American Association and the National League
Baltimore Orioles (Atlantic Association), an 1890 baseball team of the Atlantic Association
Baltimore Orioles F.C., an affiliated American League of Professional Football soccer club
 Baltimore Orioles (1901–1902), a Major League Baseball team and charter member of the American League in 1901; moved to New York in 1903 and became the team now known as the New York Yankees 
 Baltimore Orioles (minor league) (1903–1914 and 1916–1953), two baseball teams/franchises in the old Eastern League (1892–1911) and later reorganized as the International League on the Triple AAA minor leagues level
 Baltimore Orioles (ice hockey), a minor league team that operated from 1932 until 1942

Music
"Baltimore Oriole", a song written by Hoagy Carmichael and Paul Francis Webster

See also
 Oriole (disambiguation)